This article lists diplomatic missions resident in Montenegro and other cities in Montenegro. At present, the capital city of Podgorica hosts 28 embassies. Several other countries have ambassadors accredited to Montenegro, with most being resident in Belgrade.

Diplomatic missions in Podgorica

Embassies

Other missions or delegations 
 (Delegation)

Consular missions

Kotor 
 (Consulate-General)

Herceg Novi 
 (Consulate-General)

Non-resident embassies accredited to Montenegro 
Resident in Belgrade, Serbia:

Resident in Bucharest, Romania:

 
 
 
 
 

Resident in Budapest, Hungary:

 

 
 
 
 

Resident in Rome, Italy:

 
 
 

 

Resident in other cities:

 (Madrid)
 (Zagreb)
 (Vienna)
 (Moscow)
 (Prague)
 (Berlin)
 (Vienna)
 (Vienna)
 (Athens)
 (Zagreb)
 (Zagreb)
 (Luxembourg)
 (Valletta)
 (Berlin)
 (Geneva)
 (Sarajevo)
 (Sofia)
 (Tirana)
 (Moscow)
 (Athens)
 (Athens)

See also 
 Foreign relations of Montenegro
 List of Ambassadors to Montenegro

Notes

References

External links 
 Podgorica Diplomatic List  (In Montenegrin)
 The Njegoskij Fund Network: Foreign Representations in Montenegro
 Diplomatic List

Foreign relations of Montenegro
Montenegro
Diplomatic missions